The Castle of Corroy-le-Château is a medieval castle in the village of Corroy-le-Château, near Gembloux, in the province of Namur, Wallonia, Belgium. Originally built between 1220 and 1230 by William of Brabant, the castle is one of the best-preserved medieval buildings in Belgium, with gigantic round towers and a moat.

History 

After some eight hundred years in the possession of the descendants of William of Brabant, the counts of Nassau-Corroy. One of the owners was Alexis of Nassau-Corroy, bastard son of Henry III of Nassau-Breda. His descendant Joseph-Ignace de Nassau, 1st Count of Corroy, refurbished the castle and interior. The latest of whom to live there of their descendants is Olivier, Marquis de Trazegnies.

2008 auction 
A family dispute led to a court ordering the sale of the castle at public auction. In 2008, it was to be sold to the artist Wim Delvoye, who announced that he planned to turn it into a museum of modern art. However, the Marquis de Trazegnies managed to defeat the sale and retain ownership of his ancestral home. In 2010, he ceded the property to the Association Royale des Demeures Historiques et Jardins de Belgique.

See also
 List of castles in Belgium
 Trazegnies Castle

Notes

Sources
 Auction site of castle
 Corroy-le-Château – www.chateauxdelameuse.eu

Wallonia's Major Heritage
Castles in Belgium
Castles in Namur (province)
Castle of Corroy-le-Château
Historic house museums in Belgium
Castle of Corroy-le-Château